Charles Wilton may refer to:

 Charles Henry Wilton (1761–1832), English violinist, singer, composer and teacher
 Charles Richard Wilton (1855–1927), South Australia journalist and literary editor